KDDG (105.5 FM, "BOB-FM") is a commercial radio station in St. Cloud, Minnesota, airing a classic country music format. The station is owned by Lucas Carpenter, through licensee Crystal Media Group, LLC, along with sister station KASM.

History
In March 2006, KDDG changed from oldies as "Fun Lovin 105.5" to a country format, simulcasting KLCI 106.1 "Bob 106", in Elk River, Minnesota. The station previously aired a satellite-fed Alternative Rock format as "105.5 The Edge."

The KDDG call sign was previously used for KRBI-FM in Mankato, Minnesota.

Former logo

External links

Radio stations in St. Cloud, Minnesota
Classic country radio stations in the United States
Radio stations established in 2006